Moordvrouw is a Dutch television series broadcast by RTL 4 and in Flanders by VTM.

Crew 
The creative director of the first season was Joram Lürsen. After the first season he was replaced by Gerd Jan van Dalen and Marcel Visbeen. Van Dalen is also executive producer of the series. Visbeen was also director of 12 episodes. Ben Sombogaart (8), Tim Oliehoek (6), André van Duren (6), Hanro Smitsman (5) en Joram Lürsen (2) are the other directors.

The serie developer is Maarten van der Duin. He wrote the first four episodes with Lex Passchier. The other writers are: Lex Passchier (30), Pasja van Dam (8), Maarten van der Duin (4), Steven R. Thé (3), Reint Schölvinck (2), Simon de Waal (2), Michael Leendertse (1), Willem Bosch (1), and Thomas van der Ree (1).

Cast

Episodes 

2010s Dutch television series
2012 Dutch television series debuts
Dutch drama television series
RTL 4 original programming
VTM (TV channel) original programming